This article displays the qualifying draw for the Men's singles at the 2014 Australian Open.
The draw was announced on 7 January 2014, with play commencing the next day.

Seeds

Qualifiers

Lucky losers

Draw

First qualifier

Second qualifier

Third qualifier

Fourth qualifier

Fifth qualifier

Sixth qualifier

Seventh qualifier

Eighth qualifier

Ninth qualifier

Tenth qualifier

Eleventh qualifier

Twelfth qualifier

Thirteenth qualifier

Fourteenth qualifier

Fifteenth qualifier

Sixteenth qualifier

References
Qualifying Draw 
 2014 Australian Open – Men's draws and results at the International Tennis Federation

Men's Singles Qualifying
Australian Open (tennis) by year – Qualifying